Tyminski or Tymiński (feminine: Tymińska; plural: Tymińscy) is a surname. Notable people with the surname include:

 Dan Tyminski (born 1967), American musician
 Karolina Tymińska (born 1984), Polish heptathlete
 Łukasz Tymiński (born 1990), Polish footballer
 Stanisław Tymiński (born 1948), Polish-Canadian businessman
 Zbigniew Tymiński (born 1955), Polish football manager

See also
 

Polish-language surnames